Västra Karaby is a locality situated in Kävlinge Municipality, Skåne County, Sweden with 229 inhabitants in 2010.

References 

Populated places in Kävlinge Municipality
Populated places in Skåne County